Five-needle pine is a common name for several plants and may refer to:

Pinus parviflora, native to eastern Asia
Pinus peuce, native to southeastern Europe